Chacarita may refer to:
 Chacarita, Buenos Aires
 Chacarita Juniors, soccer club in Argentina
 Chacarita, Costa Rica (Chacarita District)
 Chacarita Airport, ICAO MRCH (List of airports in Costa Rica)
 Chacarita, slang word for 'shantytown' in Paraguay